Adrian Donohoe (14 January 1972 – 25 January 2013) was an Irish detective in the Garda Síochána (Irish police) based at Dundalk Garda Station in County Louth, who was fatally shot in Bellurgan (near Jenkinstown, County Louth) on 25 January 2013 during a robbery by an armed gang of five people on a credit union. He was the first garda officer to be murdered in the line of duty since 1996, and was afforded a full state funeral.

On 4 March 2018 at Dundalk District Court, 27-year-old Aaron Brady from New Road, Crossmaglen, County Armagh, was charged with Donohoe's murder and plead not guilty. Brady's trial began at the Central Criminal Court in Dublin on 28 January 2020.

On 12 August 2020, 29-year-old Aaron Brady was found guilty of the capital murder of Detective Garda Adrian Donohoe and was sentenced to the mandatory term of 40 years imprisonment. Brady was also sentenced to 14 years imprisonment for robbery at Lordship credit union.

In July 2021, 33-year-old Brendan Treanor from Dundalk was charged with the armed robbery of the Lordship credit union on the night Donohoe was murdered.

Also in July 2021, James Patrick Gerard Flynn or "Jimmy Flynn", 30, originally from South Armagh was arrested by National Crime Agency officers in London on foot of a European Arrest Warrant (EAW) issued by Gardai, after the Director of Public Prosecutions approved charging Flynn with armed robbery of the credit union on the night Donohoe was murdered. It is reported Flynn had spent time in Boston after Donohoe's murder and was described as convicted murderer Aaron Brady's "best friend".

Jimmy Flynn and Brendan Treanor are due to be tried in the Special Criminal Court in January 2023.

Personal life
Adrian Donohoe was born on 14 January 1972 in Kilnaleck, County Cavan to parents Peggy and Hugh Donohoe. He grew up on the family farm with his three brothers – Alan, Colm and Martin, and two sisters – Anne and Mary. He was a keen Gaelic footballer, and at  he played midfield for his local club before going on to represent Cavan GAA at Under-21 level. He attended nearby primary and secondary schools, before joining the Garda Síochána in 1994. Two of his brothers also joined the force, and he met his future wife Caroline at the Garda Síochána College in Templemore, County Tipperary.

Caroline Donohoe, from County Clare and who also had family members serving with the Gardaí, was stationed with the Garda National Immigration Bureau (GNIB) in Dundalk Garda Station – the same building where her husband worked – and the couple had two young children, a boy and a girl aged 6 and 7 respectively, at the time of his death. Donohoe was described as a "father figure" in his community, and played and coached for his local GAA club, St Patrick's GFC, on the Cooley Peninsula. He served his entire 19-year career in Dundalk, rising to the rank of detective. The Donohoes lived 4 km away from where the shooting occurred, and both their children attended Bellurgan National School, directly across the road from the incident.

Shooting and robbery
Detective Garda Adrian Donohoe and his colleague Detective Garda Joe Ryan were on a routine two-person cash escort on the evening of Friday, 25 January 2013. Ryan was driving an unmarked police car (a silver Ford Mondeo), both detectives were wearing civilian clothing and carrying concealed police issue sidearms (9mm SIG Sauer P226). The Garda Síochána are primarily an unarmed police force, however certain units of the service are armed (such as detective units) and up to 25% of members are licensed to carry firearms. The pair were en route to meet local credit union officials at Omeath, Cooley and the Lordship Credit Union in Bellurgan, who would then travel in a three car convoy to a bank in Dundalk town to lodge takings in a nightsafe. This was regular practice, and the protocol had been recently upgraded from an unarmed, uniformed garda escort to an armed, plain-clothes detective escort following a robbery that happened at the credit union 18 months prior, when €62,000 in cash and cheques was taken. There were no casualties in the previous crime.

At 9:30 pm, Donohoe and Ryan entered the car park of the Lordship Credit Union premises and they parked, as did another car that was accompanying them from another credit union branch. They both parked beside the car belonging to officials from Lordship. At this point a navy-blue coloured Volkswagen Passat – that had been waiting stationary on the hard shoulder of the road – drove across the road and blocked the entrance. Four members of the gang were hiding behind a wall surrounding the car park, all wearing balaclavas, while a fifth was driving the car. Two gang members approached the detectives' car from the rear, and as Donohoe opened his door and stepped out to investigate why the car had blocked the entrance, he was instantly shot at close range in the back of the head with a long barrelled shotgun by a masked raider. A single shot was fired. It was dark, and before Ryan could realise what was taking place he was held at gunpoint and ordered out of his car and onto the ground by a number of gang members possessing a shotgun, handgun and a hammer. Neither officer had time to draw their weapons. The raiders then broke into a car belonging to credit union staff from Lordship, threatening them, which was carrying cash and cheques to the value of about €40,000, but only took a bag with €4,000, mistakenly leaving behind more than €30,000. Ryan and the credit union staff were left physically uninjured as the gang of five fled the scene, but Ryan was dispossessed of his car keys in an attempt to hinder his reaction. It was only after the perpetrators had escaped that the alarm could be raised.

The emergency services pronounced Donohoe dead shortly after their arrival, despite the frantic efforts of his colleague Ryan to save his life. Garda Headquarters scrambled all available units in an attempt to catch the fleeing suspects, and alerted the Police Service of Northern Ireland (PSNI). However, it is understood they had escaped to Northern Ireland before the border was secured by police on both sides. The Republic of Ireland-United Kingdom border can be crossed by car in around 10 minutes from the Lordship Credit Union, and neither force is allowed to enter neighbouring territory. A Garda helicopter briefly entered UK airspace with permission during the search. A PSNI helicopter was also deployed during the search in the north.

Investigation
One hour after the fatal incident – at 10:30 pm on Friday, 25 January 2013 – a car matching the description of that used in the credit union hold-up was found burnt-out on Cumsons Road, Newtownhamilton, a remote forested laneway near the villages of Darkley and Keady, in south County Armagh in Northern Ireland. The PSNI carried out an extensive technical examination of the car and the surrounding area the following day. This area became a focus of the investigation. The vehicle, a "graphite navy blue" in colour 2008 Dublin registered automatic Volkswagen Passat, was linked by detectives to the murder and it was confirmed that it had been stolen from the Clogherhead area of County Louth earlier that week, between 11:30 pm on Tuesday, 22 January and 4:30 am on Wednesday, 23 January. Gardaí and the PSNI believe another getaway car was used to collect those involved in the crime after setting alight the original getaway car, and that there was more than five suspects involved in the overall perpetration of the crime.

A full forensic examination was carried out at the scene over three days by the Garda Technical Bureau, assisted by the Divisional Scenes of Crime Unit. The Divisional Search Team was called in to search the vicinity of the scene. The hammer used by the raiders to break the window of one of the credit union cars was recovered at the crime scene.

Deputy State Pathologist Khalid Jaber examined the body at the site of the incident and subsequently conducted an autopsy at Our Lady of Lourdes Hospital in Drogheda. As is standard practice when a garda loses their life, the Garda Síochána Ombudsman Commission (GSOC) was notified, and their officials visited the scene.

Then Garda Commissioner Martin Callinan (who retired in March 2014) attended a case conference at Dundalk Garda Station on the weekend after Donohoe's death, where an incident room was established for the duration of the investigation. Commissioner Callinan announced the allocation of 150 senior detectives to the case. National specialist units were assigned to the investigation, including the Special Detective Unit (SDU), National Bureau of Criminal Investigation (NBCI) and Organised Crime Unit (OCU). The force's armed intervention teams – Emergency Response Unit (ERU) and Regional Support Unit (RSU) – were placed on alert in the aftermath.

In the early stages of the investigation, there were over 1,000 Garda officers attached to the investigation, making it one of the largest criminal investigations ever undertaken in the history of the state.

Gardaí established that five males were involved in the shooting and robbery itself, and belong to a larger criminal gang operating in the border region. Those responsible were believed to have fled to Northern Ireland after the killing, and remained there for some weeks. The leader of the five-man gang and main suspect for the murder was identified as a young man from the Crossmaglen area of south Armagh. It is understood he was known to Detective Donohoe, providing a possible motive for his murder. However, Donohoe was originally not scheduled to take part in the credit union cash escort, making a late shift change with the officer who was originally scheduled to take part in the escort.

In late February, over a month after Donohoe died, Gardaí held a press briefing at the Dublin Metropolitan Region (DMR) Headquarters in Harcourt Street, Dublin City. There was a renewed appeal for information made, and two replica exhibits of evidence were shown to the media for the first time. A precision panel beating hammer with a black rubber handle, a red painted section and a soft rubber head was found at the scene, and police asked the public for help in tracing its origins. Similar mallets are used by panel beaters or mechanics repairing motorcycles. Also, a distinctive green "Cosatto" high-backed children's car booster seat carrying a "Little Monster" motif as well as a graphic of a monster was in the car when it was stolen. The child car seat – suitable for babies and young children – cost €119 to buy, and may have been dumped, offered for sale or given as a gift as investigators believe was taken out of the stolen vehicle before it was used in the killing.

In mid-April, Gardaí and the PSNI informed the public that the investigation teams were looking for information in relation to a white coloured Heavy Goods Vehicle (HGV) that was parked on the Shean Road, Forkhill, Armagh in Northern Ireland either side of 9.45 pm on 25 January 2013, the night Donohoe died. The white lorry may have been broken down, and a number of people were reportedly seen around the vehicle. The two police forces added that they wanted to speak to anyone who owned the truck, had recovered or serviced it, or anyone who saw any activity of this nature on the Shean Road on the night of 25 January.

One year on from the murder of Detective Donohoe, the Garda Commissioner visited Dundalk Garda Station, and provided an update on the progress of the murder inquiry. Martin Callinan reiterated his commitment to bringing those responsible for the crime to justice, and revealed the international dimensions to the case, involving police forces and law enforcement agencies from the United Kingdom, Netherlands, United States and Australia, as well as Europol and Interpol. The Commissioner also praised the PSNI for their involvement in the investigation. By 25 January 2014, the anniversary of Donohoe's death, over 4,000 investigative tasks had been undertaken, 4,000 "structured" lines of enquiry were pursued, 2,100 statements taken, in excess of 800 people interviewed, 400,000 hours of CCTV reviewed (the equivalent to 45 man-years), 1,200 exhibits of evidence gathered and more than 30 searches carried out under warrants during the 12 months of the investigation.

Succeeding Garda Commissioner Nóirín O'Sullivan reiterated her confidence in April 2014 that Adrian Donohoe's murderers would be brought to justice. The investigation into the murder is over 10 times the size of usual homicide investigations.

Aftermath
The death of Adrian Donohoe was strongly condemned by the President of Ireland, Michael D. Higgins and the Taoiseach, Enda Kenny. Cabinet ministers in the Republic of Ireland and Northern Ireland also spoke out against the crime. Minister for Justice Alan Shatter said that those responsible for the murder had planned it, knew that there would be police attending the credit union for an escort, and that the officers were ambushed. He warned that the perpetrators would each face the mandatory 40 years in prison for killing a garda, regardless of who fired the shot if they did not turn themselves in. Commissioner Martin Callinan vowed to hunt down and apprehend the killers. The PSNI, under Chief Constable Matt Baggott, pledged their full cooperation and support to bring to justice the murderers.

There was widespread shock and outrage among the public on the island of Ireland following the shooting dead of Donohoe, and it was considered a "national tragedy". The last garda to be shot dead serving the state was Detective Garda Jerry McCabe in June 1996, by the Provisional Irish Republican Army (IRA) in County Limerick. Jerry McCabe's widow Anne McCabe spoke of her sympathy for the Donohoe family, and retired Detective Garda Ben O'Sullivan – who was shot but survived the same incident as Jerry McCabe – signed a book of condolence for the family, friends and colleagues of the fallen officer.

Irish television programme Crimecall aired on RTÉ in February, featuring Superintendent David Taylor from the Garda Press Office appealing to the public for their help in solving the case. A Facebook tribute to Donohoe amassed over 40,000 signatures within days of the killing. The Irish League of Credit Unions offered a reward of €50,000 for information leading to arrests and prosecutions in the investigation. This reward was added to by Crimestoppers, who put forward a "substantial, five-figure sum" a month after the incident.

On 18 May 2013, the family of Adrian Donohoe were presented with a special Garda remembrance medal in his honour. The medal was awarded to his widow, Caroline, during the annual Garda Memorial Day commemoration service held at Dublin Castle. The ceremony remembers all 87 members of the Gardaí who were killed in the line of duty.

Donohoe was posthumously awarded a People of the Year Award for his bravery and fearlessness in September 2013, eight months after his unlawful death. The award was presented in Citywest, Dublin by GAA personality Mícheál Ó Muircheartaigh, and was accepted by Caroline Donohoe. She spoke of Adrian as "the love of my life" and "the best father that any child could have", adding "I will miss him every minute of every day as long as I live".

Funeral
Detective Garda Donohoe was given a full state funeral on 30 January 2013. The funeral mass took place at St Joseph's Redemptorist Church in Dundalk, and he was buried at Lordship Cemetery. There was an estimated 5,000 people present at the funeral, which included 3,500 Gardaí (2,500 uniformed and 1,000 plain-clothes) and 1,500 members of the locality and further afield. More lined the route as the procession made its way to the graveyard. It was the largest funeral in Ireland for a number of years. Among those in attendance were President Michael D. Higgins, Taoiseach Enda Kenny, Tánaiste Eamon Gilmore, Minister for Justice Alan Shatter and several senior government ministers, Garda Commissioner Martin Callinan, Irish Defence Forces Chief of Staff Lieutenant General Sean McCann, Cardinal Seán Brady, Northern Ireland Secretary of State Theresa Villiers, Northern Ireland Justice Minister David Ford and PSNI Chief Constable Matt Baggott. Fr Michael Cusack presided over the mass. Donohoe's colleague Joe Ryan, who was present when he was shot dead, was a pall-bearer at the funeral.

Police inquiries
In late February 2013, six pre-planned searches were carried out in the Dundalk area by Gardaí investigating the murder. Two men – a father and son in their 70s and 30s – were detained under terrorism legislation (Offences against the State Acts 1939–1998) and held at Drogheda Garda Station, where they could be detained for a period of 7 days without charge. A Garda spokesperson said that the arrests targeted criminal and subversive activity in the area, and were not directly related to the killing. They were released two days later, and a file was sent forward to the Director of Public Prosecutions (DPP) pending possible charges. Both men were suspected of running a vehicle theft ring, supplying stolen cars to other criminals, and that the car used in Garda Donohoe's murder may have originated from this illegal operation.

In the first week of April 2013, a number of planned raids were carried out by Gardaí in County Louth. Detectives seized mobile phones and laptop computers in a raid at a property in Hackballscross, Dundalk and seized firearms, explosives and illegal drugs during another raid at a premises in Kilsaran, Castlebellingham. No arrests were made, but the teams involved in the searches were investigating criminal elements operating in the border regions between County Louth and County Armagh, including the gang said to be responsible for Donohoe's murder. Significant forensic examinations took place following the searches in both locations.

Also in April, heavily armed members from the PSNI Special Operations Branch (C4) raided four houses in south County Armagh and seized mobile phones and documentation, as well as taking away other material for forensic examination. Senior officers informed journalists that the searches had been intelligence led, and were focused on suspected criminals or associates of members of the gang believed to have been responsible for the murder of Donohoe. No-one was detained during the four searches, but officers said that the operation's primary objective was to gather evidence. Follow-up operations to the PSNI seizures were carried out a number of weeks later south of the border by Gardaí. Several search warrants were executed by investigators in the Carlingford area of Louth.

In early May 2013, numerous searches were undertaken by Gardaí in the town of Faughart, near Dundalk. Investigating detectives were backed-up by the Emergency Response Unit, Regional Support Unit, National Bureau of Criminal Investigation, Garda Stolen Motor Vehicle Investigation Unit, Divisional Search Team and the Divisional Scenes of Crime Unit. The Garda Press Office did not disclose any results of the searches, citing "operational reasons".

Suspects
Five main suspects were identified by Gardaí and the PSNI in the course of the investigation into the murder of Donohoe, all of whom suspected of being present during the fatal shooting of the 41-year-old father-of-two, and the subsequent theft of cash and cheques from the scene. All five suspects were classified as young males, from either side of the Louth-Armagh border, part of a larger criminal gang of around 15 to 20 people, with connections through their family and acquaintances to dissident republican paramilitary and terror organisations. A number of the suspects had previous criminal convictions, as well as being implicated in other criminal investigations. Police officers from the Republic and Northern Ireland established the identity of the suspect who fired the fatal shot, understood to be the leader of the five-man gang, as a male in his early 20s, and who grew up in Crossmaglen, County Armagh, with strong links to the Crossmaglen Rangers Gaelic Athletic Club. The gang also included a pair of brothers. None of the five main suspects were immediately arrested, and it is believed that Gardaí were preparing a "watertight" case to present to the Director of Public Prosecutions before any moves were made to apprehend those responsible. Such is the nature of the crime, that any suspect charged with murder or conspiracy to commit murder of a serving member of the Garda Síochána could be tried in the non-jury Special Criminal Court in Dublin, facing a sentence of 40 years imprisonment in the maximum security Portlaoise Prison.

It emerged that a number of the suspects made prepared statements to police on both sides of the border, with their legal representatives present, in the weeks after the murder. They were then questioned under caution by the authorities.

In March 2013, the prime suspect in the unlawful killing of Donohoe fled to the United States, according to senior Garda sources. The man – in his 20s and from south Armagh – travelled from Northern Ireland to mainland Britain, before boarding a flight to New York City using a British passport. Police in Ireland, Britain and the United States were powerless to prevent the suspect travelling because there was no warrant for his arrest. However, it is known that the suspect therefore failed to show for a court sitting in Ireland for separate offences that took place before the incident in Bellurgan, County Louth. Once the suspect landed in the US, security services were made aware of his presence by the Gardaí. The New York City Police Department (NYPD) and Federal Bureau of Investigation (FBI) were furnished with the details of the suspect's identity, and the United States Marshals Service (USMS) was tasked with tracking the whereabouts of the suspect. Garda detectives also flew to the US, to help authorities trace the suspect's movements. The man was given a holiday visa by US officials upon entering the country.

Another accomplice is understood to have fled to Boston in April, before reuniting with the prime suspect in New York. In September, the girlfriend of the prime suspect – who is also herself under investigation after she provided an alibi for her boyfriend when questioned as to his whereabouts on the night of the murder to the PSNI – travelled to New York. US authorities were monitoring their movements.

In December 2013, two suspects in the murder investigation were questioned and forced to provide statements in New York to investigating Gardaí and American authorities. Senior detectives from the Garda National Bureau of Criminal Investigation travelled to the United States in late 2013, and in December they – accompanied by US law enforcement – brought two suspects in for questioning from a property in New York. Both suspects refused to answer questions, however under US law they were compelled to provide written witness statements about the incident before being released without charge. The suspects were Irish males in their early 20s, and had fled to the US following the murder of Donohoe. It has been reported that the suspects in the US were on Green Card visas at this time.

Two other male suspects in the murder case travelled to Australia, one in April 2013 (who then later fled to the US) and one in June 2013, in an attempt to avoid prosecution. The pair were suspected of involvement in the shooting and burglary, but they were not arrested and no warrant was issued. A team of detectives from the Gardaí travelled to Sydney in January 2014, and one of the suspects was forced to provide a witness statement to the authorities. It was reported that when his visa expired, he would be deported if he failed to leave the country of his own accord. Police in Australia were said to be monitoring his movements.

One of the suspects, a man in his early 20s, remained in County Down in Northern Ireland. He was questioned by the PSNI about his involvement in the crime. He has since been prosecuted in connection with rape.

In October 2016, the fiancée of one of the suspected killers was arrested by police in the US on immigration offences after Gardai sought an extradition request to have her brought back to Ireland to be charged before a court. She was deported to Ireland in January.

2017 US Arrest
On Thursday, 18 May 2017, the prime murder suspect was detained in New York by U.S. Immigration and Customs Enforcement agents for violating immigration rules and was deported back to Ireland. Unlike extradition proceedings, deportations are implemented relatively quickly. The arrest was made as a result of a targeted investigation involving Irish and US law enforcement. US police were tracking the movements of the suspect on behalf of Gardai. The US Embassy in Dublin confirmed that there had been close cooperation involving Gardai and US authorities on the matter for "some time". Senior Garda officers described the development as highly significant.

The individual was arrested and brought before a judge in Ireland after he failed to turn up in court after he was convicted of charges in relation to a separate matter.

It was reported that a former associate of the man, who is currently living in Ireland, had been assisting investigating detectives with their inquiries.

2018 Dublin, Dundalk arrests
On Sunday, 25 February 2018, the "chief suspect" in the murder case – a 27-year-old man – was arrested by the investigation team at 7.15pm outside Wheatfield Prison after completing a sentence for road traffic offences, and brought to Dundalk Garda Station, where he was questioned for a period of 7 days. This suspects' period of detention was extended after gardai made an application to the District court.

On Monday, 26 February 2018, a second man in his 50s was arrested in Dundalk and was detained at Balbriggan Garda Station. He was later released and a file was prepared for the DPP.

Aaron Brady
On Sunday, 4 March 2018 at a special sitting of Dundalk District Court, 27-year-old Aaron Brady from New Road, Crossmaglen, County Armagh, was charged with the capital murder of Detective Garda Adrian Donohoe in the course of his duty. Detective Inspector Pat Marry said that when the charge was put to Mr Brady he said: "I strongly deny any involvement in the murder of Detective Garda Adrian Donohoe." He was remanded in custody to appear before Cloverhill District Court on 9 March.

There was a heavy Garda presence at the court where a large number of members of the public gathered and members of the US Department of Homeland Security were in attendance.

Involvement of US Homeland Security & ICE
Following the charging of Brady with murder, Acting Garda Commissioner Dónall Ó Cualáin and senior investigating Gardaí met with Alysa D. Erichs, Acting Deputy Executive Associate Director of Homeland Security Investigations (HSI) and her team of U.S. Immigration and Customs Enforcement agents at Dundalk Garda Station.

U.S. Immigration and Customs Enforcement's (ICE) Homeland Security Investigations (HSI) New York, HSI Attaché London and HSI Boston worked jointly with the Garda Síochána in relation to the international investigation. The investigation revealed that Brady was living in New York, entered the United States under the Visa Waiver Program but failed to leave upon expiration of the waiver, making him amenable for arrest and deportation from the United States for immigration violations. In May 2017 HSI New York, with assistance from ICE's Enforcement and Removal Operations (ERO) in New York, were able to arrest Brady by citing an expired visa. He remained in ERO custody until he was removed from the United States, flown to Dublin, and arrested by Garda Detectives upon arrival.

Alysa D. Erichs, Acting Deputy Executive Associate Director of Homeland Security Investigations said in a statement: "The United States will not be a safe haven for cop killers. When it comes to cop killers, there are no boundaries between us. The Garda is remaining true to their promise to the Donohoe family and to the Irish people. It is an honor for HSI to have worked alongside our Garda partners to investigate, locate, arrest and deport Aaron Brady to Ireland."

According to media reports, the rest of the suspected gang members were in the US, Australia and Northern Ireland and thousands of lines of inquiry were being pursued. Gardai have vowed to pursue those involved "to the ends of the earth".

Brady found guilty of capital murder
On Monday, 10 August 2020, Brady was found guilty of robbing approximately €7,000 in cash and cheques outside Lordship Credit Union in County Louth in 2013. His conviction of the capital murder of Detective Garda Donohoe followed two days later. He would be sentenced to the mandatory term for capital murder of 40 years' imprisonment. Should he receive the maximum remission possible for good behaviour while in prison, he will be released no earlier than August 2050.

Sentencing
On Wednesday, 14 October 2020 Brady was sentenced to life in prison, to serve at least 40 years. He was also sentenced to 14 years for robbery, to run concurrently.

Aaron Brady's father, who protests his son's innocence, has since started a campaign to have his conviction overturned via social media.

Witness intimidation
Following Brady's murder conviction, detectives from the Serious Crime Review Team within the National Bureau of Criminal Investigation (GNBCI), arrested eight suspects as part of an investigation into alleged witness intimidation and perverting the course of justice during Brady's trial. During the murder trial, a video was taken on a mobile phone of a witness statement included in the book of evidence, and the footage posted on social media, with threats added to this video against the witness. Trial judge Mr Justice Michael White described this as "the most outrageous contempt of court" he had ever seen. It was reported that the prosecution was aware of "very serious" attempts to intimidate its key witnesses and efforts to collapse the murder trial. Reportedly as a result of witnesses being interfered with and intimidated, five witnesses did not testify at the Central Criminal Court. Aaron Brady was among those arrested on suspicion of witness intimidation.

In April 2021, investigating detectives sent a file to the Director of Public Prosecutions recommending that Aaron Brady be charged in relation to the intimidation of witnesses during the Donohoe murder trial.

See also
 List of Gardaí killed in the line of duty

References

History of County Louth
2013 murders in the Republic of Ireland
State funerals the Republic of Ireland
Funerals by person
Garda Síochána officers killed in the line of duty
Deaths by firearm in the Republic of Ireland
Deaths by person in the Republic of Ireland
January 2013 events in Europe
Male murder victims